Fareed Zakaria GPS is a weekly public affairs show hosted by journalist and author Fareed Zakaria on CNN and broadcast around the world by CNN International.

The "GPS" in the show's title stands for "Global Public Square," a reference to the show's focus on international issues and foreign affairs, airing Sunday at 10:00am ET to 11:00am ET, with a replay at 1:00pm ET to 2:00pm ET.

Awards
Fareed Zakaria GPS: Interpretation and Commentary on Iran and The GPS Primetime Special: Restoring the American Dream - Fixing Education won a Peabody Award in 2011 "for covering global issues in a manner that shows their true importance for viewers throughout the world." Zakaria's interview with Chinese Premier Wen Jiabao was nominated for an Emmy for "Outstanding Interview".

References

External links
 Fareed Zakaria GPS at CNN.com
 Transcripts of Fareed Zakaria GPS
 

American Sunday morning talk shows
CNN original programming
2000s American television news shows
2010s American television news shows
2020s American television news shows
2008 American television series debuts